NGC 4519 is a barred spiral galaxy located about 70 million light-years away in the constellation Virgo. NGC 4519 was discovered by astronomer William Herschel on April 15, 1784. It has a companion galaxy known as PGC 41706 and is a member of the Virgo Cluster.

Physical characteristics
NGC 4519 has an asymmetric structure that contains a well-defined bar.

See also
 List of NGC objects (4001–5000)
 NGC 4498

References

External links

Virgo (constellation)
Barred spiral galaxies
4519
41719
7709
Astronomical objects discovered in 1784
Virgo Cluster
Discoveries by William Herschel